Arconic Corporation is an American industrial company specializing in lightweight metals engineering and manufacturing. Arconic's products are used worldwide in aerospace, automotive, commercial transportation, packaging, building and construction, oil and gas, defense, consumer electronics, and industrial applications.

History
On November 1, 2016, Alcoa Inc. spun off its bauxite, alumina, and aluminum operations to a new company called Alcoa Corp.

Alcoa Inc. was renamed Arconic Inc., and retained the operations in aluminum rolling (excluding the Warrick operations), aluminum plate, precision castings, and aerospace and industrial fasteners. It focuses on turning aluminum and other lightweight metals into engineered products such as turbine blades for sectors including aerospace and automotive. It trades on the NYSE under the ARNC ticker.

Separation into Howmet Aerospace Inc. and Arconic Corp. 
On February 8, 2019, Arconic Inc. announced that it would split into two separate businesses. Arconic Inc. would be renamed Howmet Aerospace Inc. and a new company, Arconic Corporation, would be set up and spun out tax free from Arconic Inc. The new Arconic Corporation will be focused on rolled aluminum products and Howmet Aerospace on engineered products. The separation was completed effective April 1, 2020.

Controversies

Grenfell Tower fire

In 2020, the official inquiry into the Grenfell Tower fire heard evidence that Arconic products had been installed on Grenfell Tower with Arconic's approval despite Arconic knowing at the time of installation that the product did not meet the required fire safety standards. 72 people died in the fire. However, several Arconic officials refused to co-operate with the inquiry.

On 14th June, the fourth anniversary of the Grenfell fire, two activists from protest group Palestine Action staged a rooftop occupation of an Arconic factory in Kitts Green, Birmingham. The group claimed that Arconic provide "materials for Israel's fighter jets". The factory building was daubed in red paint and the Palestinian flag was waved. The occupation ended when both activists were arrested from the roof of the building two days later.

References

External links

 
Companies listed on the New York Stock Exchange
Companies based in Pittsburgh
Corporate spin-offs
Aerospace companies
American companies established in 2020
Manufacturing companies based in Pittsburgh